Geraldo Moreno Guzmán (born November 28, 1972) is a former professional baseball pitcher from the Dominican Republic. He bats and throws right-handed.

Guzmán was signed by the Montreal Expos as an amateur free agent in 1989. Guzmán pitched in the Dominican Summer League in 1990 and 1991 but suffered arm injuries and was released by the Expos. He spent the next seven or eight years working as a carpenter in the Dominican Republic, during which time he did not play baseball competitively.

Guzmán eventually returned to competitive baseball in Taiwan where he pitched for the Chinatrust Whales. After nine relief appearances for the Whales in 1999, he was signed by the Arizona Diamondbacks before the start of the 2000 season.

He had a 5–4 record in 17 games, with a 5.04 ERA.

On November 16, 2001, he was released by Arizona.

References

External links

1972 births
Living people
Arizona Diamondbacks players
Dominican Republic expatriate baseball players in the United States

Major League Baseball pitchers
Major League Baseball players from the Dominican Republic
Chinatrust Whales players
Dominican Republic expatriate baseball players in Taiwan
El Paso Diablos players
Tucson Sidewinders players